The Contra Costa Water District (CCWD) is an agency that was created in 1936 to supply water for consumers in eastern Contra Costa, California. It is now one of the largest water districts in California, serving about 500,000 people in Central and Eastern Contra Costa County.

History
The formation of CCWD was a direct result of a 13-year drought that began in California around 1917 and caused a great increase of salinity in Sacramento Delta as ocean water intruded and mixed with greatly reduced flow of fresh water from inland runoff. Fresh water for industrial use had to be brought in from elsewhere in railroad tank cars. Farmers could not afford the expense of importing water, and had to stop irrigating crops, which caused the value of land to decline.

A citizens' group calling itself the Bay Barrier Association was formed to lobby for a solution to the problem of seawater intrusion. At first the group favored building a physical barrier, but later concluded the scheme was impractical. They retained attorney Thomas Carlson to work with the Legislature, which passed a state water plan in 1931. The plan included a "Contra Costa Conduit,"(later named the Contra Costa Canal). The California Central Valley Project Act authorizing construction of structures and waterways including the Contra Costa Canal was passed in 1933 and approved by Governor James Rolph. However, the Great Depression made it impossible to build the infrastructure by selling bonds.

Carlson and his team of canal supporters went to Washington , D. C. to lobby the U. S. government for funding. Their efforts were successful, although it took three years. In August 1937, the U. S. Bureau of Reclamation (BuRec) announced that it would fund the Central Valley Project. A groundbreaking ceremony for the Contra Costa Canal occurred  in Oakley, California on November 7, 1937.

The Bay Barrier Association started planning for a Contra Costa County Water District, a legal entity to buy and distribute untreated water that would be furnished by the BuRec. Formation of the CCCWD was approved by county voters by a large margin on May 5, 1936, and incorporated as a special district on May 9, 1936. Its customers would be cities, farms and industries. These customers were responsible for treating the water so it would be safe for their own customers.

The privately-owned California Water Service Company became a buyer of CCCWD water In 1951. Later CCCWD bought all of CWSCs holdings in Contra Costa County, including its treatment, pumping, storage and distribution facilities. In 1961, CCCWD took responsibility for water service in the central part of Contra Costa County.

In 1965, CCWD broke ground to construct the Contra Loma Reservoir in Antioch.

In 1966, CCWD began construction of the Bollman Water Treatment Plant in Concord. It is now the largest treatment plant in the district, with a capacity to treat 75 MGD.

The District Center office building constructed in Concord during 1971 consolidated many of CCWD's offices and maintenance facilities in one location. The building was subsequently named for Thomas Carlson, who led the formation of the District.

In 1988, CCWD sought voter approval of the Los Vaqueros proposal that included building a  reservoir inside a  watershed. The voters approved the project, then estimated to cost $800 million. After completing the engineering work, ground was broken for construction in 1994, and the project completed in 1998.

The expansion was completed in 2012.

CCWD built the Randall-Bold Water Treatment Plant in Oakley in 1992 to treat water using ozone disinfection technology.  The plant was expanded in 2007, and now has a design capacity of 50 MGD, and is expandable to 80 MGD. The facility includes an on-site underground  storage reservoir for treated water.

Governance

Board of Directors
CCWD is governed by five directors, each of whom is elected from a division that contains approximately 110,000 persons and serves a four-year term. Candidates for director positions must be registered voters, and must reside within the district which they represent. The elections are held in November, every two years on even-numbered years. CCWD director elections follow the same schedule as the statewide office elections. 

Current Directors, as of 2022, are:
Patt Young, Director, Division 1
John A. Burgh, Director, Division 2
Ernesto A. Avila, P.E., President, Division 3
Antonio Martinez, Vice President, Division 4
Connstance Holdaway, Director, Division 5

Management
 The General Manager is responsible for the overall management of CCWD. 
 The Assistant General Manager Engineering oversees the functions of Engineering, Construction, Operations and Maintenance, Planning, and Watershed and Lands. Stephen J. Welch currently holds this position.
 The Assistant General Manager Administration  is responsible for the management of HR/Risk and Finance. Ron Jacobsma holds this position.
 The Special Assistant to the General Manager is responsible for future Los Vaqueros expansion and partnerships along with evaluations and monitoring of Bay-Delta Activities. Marguerite Patil is the Special Assistant.
 The Director of Public Affairs is in charge of the Public Affairs Department, which is responsible for public relations, media relations and community relations. Jennifer Allen is the Director.
 The Director of Operations & Maintenance is in charge of the Operations & Maintenance Department, which is responsible for all facilities involved in the supply, treatment and distribution of water. This is the largest department in the organization, having about 150 employees. Its director is Pete Schoemann.
 The Director of Engineering has the responsibility for  developing District design standards, determining project scope and budget development, providing designs and engineering support, and overall project management for treated and untreated water system infrastructure improvements. Rachel Murphy is the Director of Engineering.
 The Director of Finance is responsible for general accounting, payroll, accounts payable, accounts receivable, purchasing, customer service, meter reading, customer billing and collections, rate setting, investments, capital financing, tracking and project controls, conservation, mail distribution and maintaining the information systems of the District. Desiree Castello is the Director of Finance. 
 The Director of Planning oversees the Planning Department, which  prepares the District master plans and studies, acquiries and manages grants, develops the Ten-Year Capital Improvement Program annually, ensures compliance with environmental laws and regulations and resource protection requirements of the Los Vaqueros Watershed and mitigation properties, as well as air quality, hazardous materials, and water discharge regulations.  The Department is also responsible for land management and real property services.  Jeff Quimby is the Director of Planning.

See also
Contra Costa Canal

Notes

References

Water management authorities in California
Organizations based in Contra Costa County, California